Benair Clement Sawyer (October 18, 1822 – March 13, 1908), was the Mayor of Pittsburgh, Pennsylvania from 1862 to 1864.

Life

His family was in the soap making business. While he was mayor the American Civil War's single worst civilian accident occurred when, on September 17, 1862, the Allegheny Arsenal exploded and claimed the lives of seventy-eight people. Most of the fatalities were young women. 

After his political career, the Panic of 1873 decimated Sawyer's assets, forcing him to move to Colorado. He would later prosper there from investments in mining. He died in California.

See also

List of mayors of Pittsburgh

References

Mayors of Pittsburgh
1822 births
1908 deaths